Shuchona Foundation is a Bangladeshi non-profit foundation that works to help people with mental disability, neurological disability, autism, and mental health issues. Saima Wazed, daughter of Prime Minister Sheikh Hasina, is the founder and chairperson of the foundation.

History
Shuchona Foundation was established in 2014. It was for a while known as Global Autism. The foundation released an app with Samsung mobile called "Look at me" that specifically designed to help with autism.

On 17 May 2017, 37 commercial banks donated 1360 million taka to Shuchona Foundation along with Jatir Janak Bangabandhu Sheikh Mujibur Rahman Memorial Trust and Prime Minister’s Education Assistance Trust. On 4 June 2017, Shuchona Foundation started a program to train trainer who would provide information to lactating mothers with the Ministry of Women and Children Affairs.

References

2014 establishments in Bangladesh
Organisations based in Dhaka
Child education organizations
Disability organisations based in Bangladesh
Medical and health organisations based in Bangladesh
Foundations based in Bangladesh